Willemien Aardenburg (born August 30, 1966, in Laren, North Holland) is a former Dutch field hockey player, who won the bronze medal with the National Women's Team at the 1988 Summer Olympics in Seoul, South Korea. Aardenburg just played three international matches for the Dutch, in which she did not score.

References

External links
 
 Dutch Hockey Federation

1966 births
Living people
Sportspeople from Laren, North Holland
Dutch female field hockey players
Olympic field hockey players of the Netherlands
Field hockey players at the 1988 Summer Olympics
Olympic medalists in field hockey
Medalists at the 1988 Summer Olympics
Olympic bronze medalists for the Netherlands
20th-century Dutch women
20th-century Dutch people
21st-century Dutch women